Thirsty and Miserable is an EP released by the American doom metal band Saint Vitus in 1987 on SST Records. The title track is a cover of Black Flag. The tracks were released in 1987 on CD by SST as bonus tracks to the Born Too Late album.

Track listing
All songs written by Dave Chandler, except where noted.

 "Thirsty and Miserable" (Dez Cadena, Rosa Medea, ROBO) – 3:51 (Black Flag cover)
 "Look Behind You" – 3:18
 "The End of the End" – 5:49

Personnel

Saint Vitus
 Scott "Wino" Weinrich - vocals
 Dave Chandler - guitar
 Mark Adams - bass
 Armando Acosta - drums

Production
Joe Carducci - producer
Michael Lardie, Jim Mancuso - engineers

References

Saint Vitus (band) albums
1987 EPs
SST Records EPs